The Mountains to Sound Greenway is a 1.5 million-acre landscape situated in the Pacific Northwest. On March 12, 2019, it was designated a National Heritage Area, to be managed by the Mountains to Sound Greenway Trust, as part of the John D. Dingell Jr. Conservation, Management, and Recreation Act. In 1998, it became the first National Scenic Byway to be designated in Washington.

The corridor stretches along Interstate 90 between Seattle and Ellensburg, following several historic transportation routes and a network of bicycling and hiking trails. Its formal boundaries are along several watersheds: the Yakima to the east, the Cedar to the south, Snoqualmie and Lake Washington to the north, and Puget Sound to the west.

The Greenway was first envisioned in 1990, when a group of citizens hiked from the Cascade Crest alongside Interstate 90. In 1991, the Mountains to Sound Greenway Trust was founded to prevent the encroachment of urban sprawl on the natural areas near Snoqualmie Pass and to use them to connect Seattle and Central Washington. Its creation has been criticized for attracting public funds that could have been used on other ecological protection projects.

References

External links 

 Mountains to Sound Greenway Trust, official website for local coordinating entity
 Guide to the Mountains to Sound Greenway Trust Records 1993-2016

Nature conservation in the United States
Non-profit organizations based in Seattle
Environmental organizations based in Washington (state)
National Heritage Areas of the United States